"The 30th" is a song by American singer-songwriter Billie Eilish. It is part of her second extended play, Guitar Songs (2022), a two-track project that consists of two sentimental ballads with soft vocals over acoustic guitar. Exploring themes of death and pain, "The 30th" details the minutiae of a car accident—during the bridge, Eilish names several alternate scenarios that ask if the subject would have survived had the circumstances surrounding the day of the accident been different.

"The 30th" was released on July 21, 2022, peaking at number 79 on the US Billboard Hot 100 chart and reaching the top 40 in four countries. It was written on December 30, 2021, as a narration of a near-death car accident Eilish's friend experienced one month prior; the song derives the title from the date of the accident. Critics were positive about the song's personal nature, and some believed that the lyrics were a testament to Eilish's songwriting skills.

Background 

After the release of her second studio album, Happier Than Ever, in July 2021, Billie Eilish and her producer Finneas O'Connell began formulating ideas for songs that she wanted to include on her next one starting the end of the year. The first song that they wrote after Happier Than Ever was "The 30th", titled as a reference to November 30, 2021. On that day, someone close to her fell victim to a car accident, and she described seeing the event firsthand as "the most indescribable thing [she had] to witness and experience".

Eilish wrote "The 30th" on December 30, 2021, virtually immediately upon recalling the accident on that date, fueled by stream-of-consciousness thoughts about the event. Finneas was a co-writer and the producer for the song; Dave Kutch handled audio mastering, whereas Rob Kinelski and Eli Heisler worked on the mixing. The next song that Eilish and Finneas wrote was "TV", a ballad about watching television to distract one's self from problems plaguing the world.

By July 2022, those were the only songs that the two had made; they tried to entertain the idea of including them on Eilish's third album. She had shelved her voice memos for "The 30th" for several weeks, and upon stumbling across the recordings again, Eilish wanted to share what the song's lyrics had to offer to her fans as soon as possible. Noting the immediacy of it and "TV", she said: "These songs are really current for me, and they're songs that I want to have said right now." She decided to exclude "The 30th" from the third album's track list after a discussion with Finneas, despite announcing plans to start the corresponding recording sessions beforehand.

Music and lyrics 

"The 30th", as with "TV", is a ballad with a minimalist production that combines Eilish's soft vocals over an acoustic guitar. Its sound is intentionally reminiscent of Eilish's and Finneas's oldest works, which were created when they wanted to write music at their parents' house with nothing but a guitar. The song, dedicated to one of Eilish's closest friends, centers around the November car accident and primarily explores themes of death and pain.

Eilish narrates how the friend went unconscious after the crash and remembered what happened to them when they woke up inside a travelling ambulance. She comments about the scene: "when you’re staring into space / It's hard to believe you don't remember it". To tell the story from her point of view, she reveals that she was on the same road as the car accident, wondering why there was a traffic jam. According to Eilish, she saw ambulances passing by, but she "didn't even think of pulling over". She sings that she learnt of the full story that night. In the chorus, she reminds her friend that they called her while in the hospital. The friend told her that they felt scared about what happened, and Eilish provided reassurance by saying "so was I" and telling them that they looked pretty.

When the song crescendos towards its bridge, its guitar chords slowly build up and the vocals begin to overlap, evoking a racing mind and a growing sense of panic. She lists alternate scenarios that question if the friend would still be alive had the accident occurred at another day and in other locations—a street with young children, a bridge without a railroad to block any oncoming traffic, or Angeles Crest Highway during snowfall. Eilish wonders what if the friend was driving to someplace secluded with children in the passenger seats, unable to contact others for help. Closing the bridge, she says "if you changed anything, would you not have survived?" before she repeats the words "you're alive". On the last "you're alive", the vocal layering ends, leaving only Eilish's soft voice. The chorus appears again after the bridge, but this time, Eilish changes the final line "so was I" to "so am I".

August Brown, a writer for the Los Angeles Times, thought that the instrumentation for "The 30th" was reminiscent of the works of George Harrison, guitarist for the Beatles. Consequence Mary Siroky opted to compare the song, specifically its build-up to the bridge, to the "unforgettable explosion" of Happier Than Ever title track. To contrast the two, she argued that listeners expect "The 30th" to provide catharsis in a similar way as the title track, but it instead "pulls back, leaving us gasping for air".

Release and reception 

Darkroom and Interscope Records released Eilish's second extended play (EP), Guitar Songs, on July 21, 2022; the release came without any prior warning. The EP consists of "TV" and "The 30th", tallying two songs for the track list.  Having grown tired of traditional promotion for upcoming music, Eilish wanted to release them without heavy marketing like she had been doing early in her career. Upon the EP's release, "The 30th" charted in multiple territories. In the US, the song debuted at number 79 on the Billboard Hot 100 and at number 11 on Hot Rock & Alternative Songs. Elsewhere, it reached the top 40 of charts in Ireland, New Zealand, Australia, and the UK. In terms of international commercial performance, "The 30th" entered the Billboard Global 200 at number 50.

Critics were positive about the closely personal lyrics in "The 30th", which they believed were emotionally powerful and a testament to Eillish's writing talent. They wrote that she managed to create an effectively tragic story in the song, use narrative details with "great subtlety", and discuss poignant themes without downplaying their seriousness, leading Snapes to describe the song's writing style as realist. Praise was also directed towards Eilish's voice and the production choices for the song. Wang deemed her vocals "powerful"; Jason Lipshutz of Billboard sensed improvement in her vocal technique and called it "increasingly confident", and he appreciated the song's acoustic musical style. Snapes wrote of its composition compared to that of "TV": "The guitar is sweeter, her voice even more delicate[.]"

Entertainment columnists for the Manila Bulletin argued that the song's self-reflection, which they associated with all the greatest songwriters before her, served as a reminder that she "remains one of the most treasured singer-songwriters of her generation". For a similar reason, Siroky selected "The 30th" as the best new song of the week ending July 22, 2022. She was amazed by the lyrics' vulnerability and relatability, favoring the bridge in particular.

Live performances 
Eilish and Finneas performed "The 30th" live for the first time a few weeks after the EP's release, during the Manila concert of a 2022–2023 world tour in support of Happier Than Ever. Prefacing the performance, Eilish remarked that it was hard to sing due to the personal lyrics. After the tour's Asian leg, she and Finneas collaborated with Singapore's tourism board to film a live performance of "The 30th", set at the Gardens by the Bay. She shared the video to her YouTube account on September 21, 2022.

Personnel 
Credits adapted from Tidal.

 Billie Eilishvocals, songwriting, engineering, vocal editing
 Finneas O'Connellsongwriting, production, engineering, vocal editing, bass, drums, guitar, piano, programming, synthesizer
 Dave Kutchmastering
 Rob Kinelskimixing
 Eli Heislerassistant mixing

Charts

Weekly charts

Year-end charts

References

Notes

Sources 

2020s ballads
2021 songs
Billie Eilish songs
Song recordings produced by Finneas O'Connell
Songs written by Billie Eilish
Songs written by Finneas O'Connell
Vehicle wreck ballads
Songs based on actual events